Petra Weis (born 28 December 1957) is a German politician from the Social Democratic Party. She was Member of the German Bundestag for the Duisburg I constituency from 2002 to 2009.

References 

1957 births
Living people
People from Duisburg
Members of the Bundestag for the Social Democratic Party of Germany
Members of the Bundestag for North Rhine-Westphalia

Members of the Bundestag 2002–2005
Members of the Bundestag 2005–2009
Female members of the Bundestag
21st-century German women politicians